Ring Around Rosie is a 1957 studio album by Rosemary Clooney and the vocal group The Hi-Lo's.

Track listing
 "Don'cha Go 'Way Mad" (Illinois Jacquet, Jimmy Mundy, Al Stillman) – 2:09
 "Moonlight Becomes You" (Johnny Burke, Jimmy Van Heusen)- The Hi-Lo's alone – 3:13
 "Love Letters" (Edward Heyman, Victor Young) – 2:27
 "I Could Write a Book" (Lorenz Hart, Richard Rodgers) - The Hi-Lo's alone – 2:00
 "I'm in the Mood for Love" (Dorothy Fields, Jimmy McHugh) – 3:30
 "Coquette" (Johnny Green, Gus Kahn, Carmen Lombardo)- The Hi-Lo's alone – 2:18
 "Together" (Lew Brown, Buddy DeSylva, Ray Henderson) – 2:42
 "Everything Happens to Me" (Tom Adair, Matt Dennis) – 3:27
 "(In My) Solitude" (Eddie DeLange, Duke Ellington, Irving Mills) - The Hi-Lo's alone – 3:54
 "What Is There to Say?" (Vernon Duke, Yip Harburg) – 3:21
 "I'm Glad There Is You" (Tommy Dorsey, Paul Madeira) – 3:31
 "How About You?" (Ralph Freed, Burton Lane) – 2:26

Personnel
 Rosemary Clooney – vocal
 The Hi-Lo's

References 

1957 albums
The Hi-Lo's albums
Rosemary Clooney albums
Columbia Records albums
Covers albums